Highway 793 is a provincial highway in the Canadian province of Saskatchewan. It runs from Highway 24 to Highway 55. Highway 793 is about 51 km (32 mi.) long.

Highway 793 passes through or near the communities of Debden, Ormeaux, and Victoire. It also passes through the Big River Indian Reserve and intersects Highway 695.

See also 
Roads in Saskatchewan
Transportation in Saskatchewan

References 

793